Unión Miraflores was a Peruvian football club, located in the district of Miraflores, Lima.

The club was founded with the name of club Centro Sport Unión Miraflores and played in Primera Division Peruana from 1912 until 1921.

They were runners-up in the Primera División in 1917, but did not appear in the Peruvian leagues after 1925.

See also
List of football clubs in Peru
Peruvian football league system

References

Football clubs in Lima